Venantius (Venance; died 544) was the Bishop of Viviers in the Ardèche. He became a Roman Catholic Saint.

References

544 deaths
Bishops of Viviers
6th-century Christian saints
French Roman Catholic saints